The following is a list of current NCAA Division I baseball coaches. Currently, 297 programs compete at the Division I level in NCAA college baseball. Each program employs a head coach. The longest-tenured head coach is Tony Rossi, who has been the head coach at Siena since the start of the 1970 season.

Coaches
The table below includes the program, conference, and head coach of each Division I baseball program. Conference affiliations are current for the next NCAA baseball season in 2023.

See also

 List of current NCAA Division I men's basketball coaches
 List of current NCAA Division I women's basketball coaches
 List of current NCAA Division I FBS football coaches
 List of current NCAA Division I FCS football coaches
 List of current NCAA Division I men's ice hockey coaches
 List of NCAA Division I men's soccer coaches

Notes

References

Coach
Baseball coaches